Uno Flip! (from Italian and Spanish for 'one') is an American shedding-type card game produced by Mattel. The cards from the deck are specially printed for the game. This game is a variation of Uno.

Uno Flip! should not be confused with a dexterity-based game called Uno Flip.

Gameplay
As in the original Uno, the goal of Uno Flip! is to be the first to play all the cards in one's hand, scoring points for the cards still held by others.

All cards are two-sided, consisting of the "light" side with white fonts and borders and the "dark" side with black fonts and borders. Only one side is in play at any given time, starting with the light side at the start of each new hand. Each side has its own set of four colors, action and Wild cards, and number cards from 1 through 9.

Both sides contain two "Flip" cards in each of their respective colors. Whenever a Flip is played, both the stockpile and the discard pile are immediately turned over and all players must turn their hands around to play the other side of their cards.

Light Side
Colors for this side are red, blue, yellow, and green. The effects of action cards on this side are milder. Special cards are as follows:

 Draw One: Next player in sequence draws one card and loses a turn.
 Skip: Next player in sequence loses a turn.
 Reverse: Switches the order of play (clockwise to counterclockwise, and vice versa).
 Wild: Player names the next color to be matched. May be used on any turn.
 Wild Draw Two: Player names the next color to be matched; next player in sequence draws two cards and loses a turn. May only be used if the player has no cards of the current color.
 Flip: Switches all cards from light to dark side.

Dark Side
Colors for this side are teal, orange, pink, and purple. The effects of action cards on this side are stronger. Special cards are as follows:

 Draw Five: Next player in sequence draws five cards and loses a turn.
 Skip Everyone: Grants an extra turn.
 Reverse: Same as light side.
 Wild: Same as light side.
 Wild Draw Color: Player names the next color to be matched; next player in sequence must draw cards until they get one of that color, after which they lose a turn. May only be used if the player has no cards of the current color.
 Flip: Switches all cards from dark to light side.

Penalties
A player who fails to call "Uno" after playing their next-to-last card and is caught by another player before the next draw/play must draw two cards as a penalty.

When a Wild Draw Two or Wild Draw Color is played, the next player in sequence may challenge its use if they believe the holder could have played a card of the matching color. The challenged player must then show their cards privately. If the challenge is valid, the challenged player must draw the cards, if not, the challenger must draw them, plus two more as a penalty.

Scoring
When one player uses their last card, they have "gone out" and the hand is over. That player scores points for all cards held by opponents as follows:

 Number cards: Face value
 Draw One: 10 points
 Draw Five, Reverse, Skip, Flip: 20 points
 Skip Everyone: 30 points
 Wild: 40 points
 Wild Draw Two: 50 points
 Wild Draw Color: 60 points

Points are scored based on the side that is in play after the last card is laid down. If a player goes out by using any card that requires the next player to draw, that player must draw the appropriate number of cards before the scores are tallied.

The first player to score 500 points wins the game.

Reception

On Board Game Geek, the game scored 6.6 out of 10. A digital adaptation also received "generally positive reviews", according to the review aggregator Metacritic.

References

Uno (card game)
Card games introduced in 2019